Svavar Knútur is the stage name of Icelandic singer-songwriter Svavar Knútur Kristinsson, from the Northwest of Iceland and the Eastfjords, but living in the town of Akureyri. He sings in Icelandic and English,
Svavar Knútur collaborated with Czech singer-songwriter Markéta Irglová on his album Ölduslóð (way of waves).
Svavar Knútur has in recent years toured extensively around Europe as well as doing some touring of Australia and North America.
Svavar Knútur is one of the founding members and curators of the Melodica festival, curating the Reykjavík branch of the festival. In the German town of Schleswig Svavar Knútur has played multiple times on the Norden Festival in 2018 and 2019.

Album history 
Svavar has released four solo albums beginning in 2009 with Kvöldvaka (Songs by the Fire.) In 2010, he presented Amma (Songs for my Grandmother,) and in 2012 his Ölduslóð (Way of Waves).

In 2015 "Brot (The Breaking)" was released.

Svavar's latest album is "Ahoy! Side A", which was released via Dimma and Nordic Notes in September 2018. A story of new beginnings and the challenges of a new world. It contains five new songs and four "Repaintings" of older songs.

Discography
Kvöldvaka (Songs by the fire) (Dimma, 2009)
Amma (Songs for my Grandmother) (Beste! Unterhaltung, 2010)
Glæður With Kristjana Stefáns (Dimma, 2011)
Ölduslóð (Way of Waves) (Beste! Unterhaltung, 2012)
Songs of Weltschmerz, Waldeinsamkeit and Wanderlust EP (Beste! Unterhaltung; Dimma, 2015)
Brot (The Breaking) (Nordic Notes, 2015)
My Goodbye Lovelies (Nordic Notes, 2017)
AHOY! SIDE A  (Nordic Notes, 2018)
Morgunn (Acoustic Version) Single (2020)
Bil (Between) EP (Nordic Notes, 2020)
 Faðmlög With Kristjana Stefáns (Nordic Notes, 2020)
The tide is rising - Single (2021)
Hope and Fortune - Single feat. Irish Mythen (2021)

External links

Spotify account
Facebook
Youtube profile
Instagram account
Twitter account
Bandcamp profile

References 

21st-century Icelandic male singers

Icelandic singer-songwriters
Indie folk musicians
Icelandic composers